Pararheinheimera tilapiae is a Gram-negative, rod-shaped, aerobic and motile bacterium from the genus of Pararheinheimera which has been isolated from a pond which was cultivated with Tilapiine cichlid fish from Taiwan.

References 

Chromatiales
Bacteria described in 2013